Port Noarlunga may refer to:

 Port Noarlunga, a former port associated with the current suburb of Port Noarlunga, South Australia
 Port Noarlunga Football Club, an Australian rules football club in South Australia
 Port Noarlunga South, South Australia, a suburb
 Port Noarlunga Reef, a reef located within the Port Noarlunga Reef Aquatic Reserve
 Port Noarlunga Reef Aquatic Reserve, a marine protected area in South Australia

See also

Noarlunga (disambiguation)